The Connecticut Hammerheads were a Major League Lacrosse (MLL) professional men's field lacrosse team based in Fairfield, Connecticut. The team played for one season during the 2020 season. The team's home field was Rafferty Stadium located on the campus of Fairfield University.

History
On February 11, 2020, MLL announced that it had granted an expansion franchise to the Fairfield, Connecticut, one day after the league folded the Dallas Rattlers. The team will be the league's first team to play in the state of Connecticut since the Bridgeport Barrage, which played from 2001 to 2003 before relocating to Philadelphia. The league named Rattlers' head coach Bill Warder to the same position with the Connecticut Hammerheads.

Less than a week later, the Hammerheads announced they were trading Bryce Wasserman, a Dallas native, to the Boston Cannons in exchange for Will Sands.

The Hammerheads had seven picks in the collegiate draft, including the second overall pick. They used that option on Michael Kraus, an attack from the defending NCAA champion Virginia Cavaliers. Kraus was also a selection with the competing Premier Lacrosse League, but on May 14 he officially signed a two-year deal to join the Hammerheads.

On July 18, the Hammerheads played their first game, in quarantined fashion at Navy-Marine Corps Memorial Stadium in Annapolis, against the Denver Outlaws. The Outlaws controlled the game from the start, defeating Connecticut, 18-6. Ryan McNamara had the first goal in franchise history and Bradley Voigt led the team with three goals on the night.

Four days later, the team got its first victory in franchise history against the New York Lizards, 10-8. Kraus picked up his first two career goals and Voigt again led the way with four scores. Defending Goalie of the Year Sean Sconone stopped 65% of the shots he faced. The team picked up its second win the next day against the Boston Cannons by a score of 11-8. Sconone dazzled with a new franchise record 73.3 save percentage. With their 14-9 win over the Chesapeake Bayhawks on July 24 in the regular season finale, the Hammerheads would clinch the second overall playoff seed in their first season.

Season-by-season

Head Coaching History

Roster 

(C)- captain

(A)- alternate captain

Source:

References

External links
 Official website

Connecticut Hammerheads
Lacrosse teams in Connecticut
Lacrosse clubs established in 2020
2020 establishments in Connecticut
Sports clubs disestablished in 2020
2020 disestablishments in Connecticut
Fairfield, Connecticut
Defunct sports teams in Connecticut